The Kwari River, also known as the Kuwari or Kunwari River, flows through the Sheopur, Morena and Bhind districts of Madhya Pradesh in central India. The total length of the river is approx 220 km.

Geography 
The river originates near the village of Devpura. The Kwari is a tributary of the Sindh River, draining into the Sindh at the Etawah District. The Sindh River joins the Yamuna River further downstream at Pachnada. The towns of Bijeypur and Kailaras are located along its bank. The river has no tributaries.
The Kwari Bridge was constructed in 1962.

The total catchment of the river is 23 999 km2.

Culture 
The river was mentioned in the epic Mahabharata.

Some upstream farmers have been accused of diverting water flows leading to water scarcity downstream.

Etymology

According to legend, a local maiden was secretly accustomed to taking her two bulls to a well to drink. No one else could water cattle there, for the water level was too low. However, the girl was able to make the water rise by taking off her garments and making a prayer. One day, a man grew curious about her power and followed her to the well. When the girl realized that the man had witnessed her nude, she was covered in shame. She jumped into the well, which subsequently overflowed and turned into a stream, hereafter named the "Kwari River," which means "the virgin's river."

References

Rivers of Madhya Pradesh
Rivers of India